Phalwari is an administrative village in Shakargarh Tehsil, Narowal District, Pakistan. It is located very near to Shakargarh city.

Demographics 
The area of the village is approximately 100 square kilometers. The village has a primary school for girls and bBoys separately organized by the Government of the Punjab. It is one of the most populated village of Shakargarh. The southern side of the village is bonded with Maryal and Shakargarh.

References

Narowal District
Villages in Shakargarh Tehsil